Rowland Leonard Worsley (12 July 1907 – ?) was an Australian politician.

He was born in Margate. In 1942 he was elected to the Tasmanian Legislative Council as the Labor member for Huon. He served as a minister from 1946 until 1948, when he lost his seat.

References

1907 births
Year of death missing
Members of the Tasmanian Legislative Council
Australian Labor Party members of the Parliament of Tasmania